The Silent Guest is a 1945 German crime film directed by Harald Braun and starring René Deltgen, Gisela Uhlen and Rudolf Fernau. It was one of the final films released during the Nazi era. It received its Austrian premiere in Vienna in 1950.

The film's sets were designed by the art director Emil Hasler, Carl Ludwig Kirmse and Walter Kutz.

Cast
 René Deltgen as  Matthias Radscheck
 Gisela Uhlen as Lisa Radscheck
 Rudolf Fernau as Oskar Kampmann
 Jaspar von Oertzen as Gendarm Geelhaar
 Carsta Löck as Marianne Ebeling
 Willi Rose as Eduard, Ladengehilfe
 Ethel Reschke as Trude, Kaltmamsell
 Herbert Hübner as Von Wedelstedt, Gutsbesitzer
 Friedhelm von Petersson as Dieter von Wedelstedt
 Sigrid Becker as Helene, Magd
 Walter Janssen as Eccelius, Apotheker
 Ingolf Kuntze as Prosecutor
 Josef Sieber as Jakob, Knecht
 Toni Impekoven as Vohwinkel, Gerichtsrat
 Karl Hannemann as Buggenhagen
 Arnim Suessenguth as Siebenkorn, Schmuggler
 Hella Thornegg as  Witwe Wagenbrett
 Gert Geiger as  Wonnekamp

References

Bibliography

External links

1945 films
1945 crime films
German crime films
Films of Nazi Germany
1940s German-language films
Films directed by Harald Braun
Films based on German novels
Films based on works by Theodor Fontane
UFA GmbH films
German black-and-white films
1940s German films